Dervish movement or Dervish revolt may refer to:

 Dervish movement (Somali), an anti-colonial resistance movement in Somalia
 Dervish movement (Sudan), an anti-colonial movement that fought the Mahdist War